Zoran Tomčić (born 26 February 1970) is a Croatian retired footballer.

External links
 
 

1970 births
Living people
Association football forwards
Croatian footballers
HNK Segesta players
VfL Wolfsburg players
KFC Uerdingen 05 players
FC Stahl Brandenburg players
SV Babelsberg 03 players
NK TŠK Topolovac players
NK Kamen Ingrad players
NK Hrvatski Dragovoljac players
Croatian Football League players
2. Bundesliga players
Bundesliga players
Regionalliga players
Croatian expatriate footballers
Expatriate footballers in Germany
Croatian expatriate sportspeople in Germany